A township trustee or a town trustee is an official with authority who is elected over civil township government. The role of a trustee, or board of trustees, may involve helping the poor with basic necessities, provided that they have exhausted all other options of support. Residents may apply for support for a number of needs including help with shelter or housing costs, utility bills, food, clothing, medical needs, burial expenses, or school supplies. In many forms of townships, the term applies to multiple trustees who together form the township board.  In some others, the trustee is a single officer separate from the board; the Indiana township trustees are examples of this form.

The term "town trustee" has also been used for members of the governing board of the Sheffield Town Trust since at least the 16th century, though that institution has been organized as a charity since the 19th century.

References

Heads of local government
Local government officers